Alfredo Amarilla (born 7 October 1972) is a Paraguayan footballer. He played in seven matches for the Paraguay national football team from 1999 to 2001. He was also part of Paraguay's squad for the 2001 Copa América tournament.

References

External links
 

1972 births
Living people
Paraguayan footballers
Paraguay international footballers
Place of birth missing (living people)
Association football midfielders